Thomas Mokorosi (born 9 February 1981) is a South African cricket umpire. He has stood in matches in the 2016–17 Sunfoil 3-Day Cup and the 2016–17 CSA Provincial One-Day Challenge tournaments. He is part of Cricket South Africa's umpire panel for first-class matches.

References

External links
 

1981 births
Living people
South African cricket umpires
People from Maseru